The Lepida Gorge is a natural formation of Mount Parnon, located in the region of Arcadia, Peloponnese. Despite having a length of only 500 metres, a relatively big waterfall of 70 meters height and a smaller one of 45 meters run through its course.

The waterfalls' springs start from the Xirokabi plateau, located between the village of Agios Ioannis and Malevi monastery. As the river flows down from the plateau to the gorge, it forms little lakes throughout its course.

The gorge is ideal for canyoning and rappelling excursions.

It is 3.3km from Agios Ioannis. The old Oria Castle is nearby.

References

Canyons and gorges of Greece
Waterfalls of Greece
Landforms of Arcadia, Peloponnese